Robert Castaigne (born 1947) is the chief financial officer of Total S.A. He has held the position since 1990.
He is a graduate engineer from École centrale de Lille, with further specialization at École nationale supérieure du pétrole et des moteurs. He also  holds a Doctorate in economics.

References

External links
 "Total S.A. (ADR)" on Google Finance

1947 births
Living people
École centrale de Lille alumni
French businesspeople
Chief financial officers